Darüşşafaka is an underground rapid transit station on the M2 line of the Istanbul Metro. It is located under Büyükdere Avenue in southern Sarıyer. The station was opened on 2 September 2010 as a northern expansion of the M2 line. Until 29 October 2011 it served as the northern terminus until the line was further extended to Hacıosman. Darüşşafaka has an island platform serviced by two tracks.

Layout

References

Railway stations opened in 2010
Istanbul metro stations
Sarıyer
2010 establishments in Turkey